Events from the year 1723 in Denmark.

Incumbents
 Monarch – Frederick IV
 Grand Chancellor – Ulrik Adolf Holstein

Events

8 March - The Povel Juel Plot: The Norwegian civil servant and author Povel Juel was executed in Copenhagen, for his plans to depose Frederick IV as King of Norway.

Births
 5 January – Andreas Bodenhoff, businessman (died 1794)
 31 March – Frederick V, king (died 1766)

Deaths
  March 8 – Povel Juel, civil servant and writer (born 1673)

References

 
1720s in Denmark
Denmark
Years of the 18th century in Denmark